On Tuesday, 18 November 1947, a fire engulfed Ballantynes department store in central Christchurch, New Zealand. 41 people died; 39 employees and two auditors, who found themselves trapped by the fire, or were overcome by smoke while evacuating the store complex without a fire alarm or evacuation plan. It remains the deadliest fire in New Zealand history.

Background
Ballantynes is a Christchurch department store that traces its origins back to a millinery and drapery business that began in the front room of a Cashel Street residence in 1854. After being named Dunstable House and going through various of owners and buildings as it grew, it was purchased by John Ballantyne in 1872. The business was managed as a series of partnerships involving Ballantyne family members until the company formed as J. Ballantyne & Co. in 1920.

From its humble beginnings the Ballantyne's business expanded until, by 1947, it occupied 80 m of street front in Cashel Street, 50 m in Colombo Street and another 21 m in Lichfield Street. This prime corner site covered approximately an acre, which contained seven conjoined buildings - six of which had three or more hardwood floors - that were interconnected on multiple levels by large passageways between the buildings to allow staff and customers to move freely about the store. 

By the time of the fire, Ballantyne's was widely known as the queen of department stores in the city. The showrooms, fitting rooms, art gallery and sumptuous tearooms catered to the elite of Canterbury. The business was owned and managed by two brothers who were of the Ballantyne family. 

While its exterior was a dignified Italianate facade, there were issues in the interior. The store's interior partitions had untreated soft wood-fibre linings that had been permitted by the Christchurch City Council contrary to its own bylaws. Due to the quantity of clothes made on the premises, the buildings were classified as factory buildings, which helped them to pass a Labour Department inspection in 1943. Two of the buildings had been constructed before fire escapes became a mandatory requirement, and the Fire Brigade had not directed the owners to install them despite a 1930 bylaw requiring it to do so.

Fire protection was provided by manual fire extinguishers, although staff were not formally trained in their use. There were manually operated fire doors that could be closed across the openings between buildings. Klaxons that had been installed during the Second World War and the Vigilant sprinkler fire alarm in one building had not been maintained and both were eventually removed. Although the store had held evacuation drills during wartime, these had ended when hostilities ceased. There was no emergency evacuation plan and evacuation was left to the initiative of individual department heads. Many staff only knew the layout of their own workrooms and were unaware of alternative egress routes.

At the time of the fire, Ballantynes employed 458 people, over 300 of whom were women. Many of these workers worked on the upper floors in various back-office departments. The company claimed after the fire that around 250 to 300 customers were inside the building when smoke was first seen coming from a cellar, many of whom were not inside the showrooms but inside the elaborate neoclassical tearooms on an upper floor, having afternoon tea while listening to a string trio.

Fire
It started in the basement of the furniture department, which was located at the southern end of the Colombo Street frontage of the complex. The cause of the fire was never established. Although an electrical fault or a discarded cigarette butt were both suggested as possibilities, the former could not be excluded by the commission of enquiry. The latter was considered equally unlikely as Keith Smith, the employee who was last working in the cellar, had left at about 3:30pm for his afternoon tea break. He had gone across the street to smoke a cigarette with a friend, since Ballantynes had a strict no-smoking policy on its premises.

Just after 3:30pm, smoke from the fire was first noticed coming up the cellar stairs. The staff had no access to a formal fire evacuation plan. Staff discovering the fire informed their floor manager about their own initiative. Someone contacted the phone operator and stated that the fire brigade was called. The sequence of delays, errors, and fatal mistakes made by management during the next 25 minutes have been portrayed most memorably in the novel Gardens of Fire by historian and novelist Stevan Eldred-Grigg, who based the book on detailed research and interviews with survivors. Some showrooms on the ground floor were evacuated by sales employees taking their own initiative, but staff in some of the other showrooms on the ground floor were ordered by management to 'carry on' or 'stand by'. As soon as things got hot for them, they left on their own behest. Staff in other areas of the building complex were not even made aware of the fire, as there was no fire alarm. Some staff returned to their work areas after their tea-break while others evacuated the building. Even the arriving fire brigade crews did not realise at once that there were still people on the upper floors of the building complex.

The first telephone call to the fire brigade was logged at 3:46pm, though the phone operator simply stated that she was told to inform them there was a cellar fire at Ballantyne's. When the first fire appliance arrived about two minutes later at the Lichfield Street entrance, the firefighters saw no sign of fire there. They then moved onto Colombo Street, where they saw smoke coming out of an enclosed alleyway. They were met by joint managing director Roger Ballantyne, who showed the fire crew a back access way to the cellar. They spent about 10 minutes searching for the seat of the fire but were unable to locate it. Two other appliances had made their way to Ballantynes via Cashel Street and set up as the search commenced. The senior fire officer ordered a Brigade Call, although that order was only received by the fire station at 4:00pm. The firefighter making the call had to first push through the crowd to get to a pharmacy and then had to wait for the overloaded telephone exchange lines to clear before he could make the call.

Half an hour after the fire was approximately discovered, the heat and smoke went into flashover, erupting across the conjoined first-floors of the Congreve's, Goodman's, and Pratt's buildings. After flashover the first floor was almost instantly consumed by a wall of flame. Over time superheated gas and fire began working into the floors above. Workers on the multiple top floor attempted to denote their location to firefighters by banging at windows before being killed by heat, fire or smoke. However, the fire-brigade ladders were obstructed from reaching the top floor by the store's rigid verandahs.  

Two credit department employees jumped together from a top-floor window of Pratt's Building on the corner of Colombo and Cashel Streets. They landed, injured but alive, on a slate verandah and were rescued by members of the public using a ladder and taken to hospital. Violet Cody, another credit worker, leapt from another window in Pratt's Building, whereupon she landed on another slate verandah. She then slewed upside down and then fell head first to the pavement in Cashel Street. She and her unborn child later died in the hospital. 

Kenneth Ballantyne had found himself trapped. Along with some of the women from the credit department and in spite of the growing signs of disaster, he had kept the staff working until about 3:55pm. At this point he climbed out onto a window ledge as the fire engulfed the floor behind him and was the last person to be rescued by firefighters from Pratt's Building at 4:10pm. Forty-one of his staff perished. 

It has been noted that office employees were not evacuated as the policy required that insured equipment be stored away in a fireproof strong room first. These consisted of 25 bins, two typewriters, several adding machines and a number of boxes of records. These survived the fire.

The centre of the complex began to collapse soon after. Firefighters and Police were able to gain entry to the ground floor about 6pm, where they found a number of bodies near the exits and others hanging from beams. None of the victims were identifiable apart from Violet Cody. The fire was put out by 8pm, leaving the building as a gutted shell. It took four days to dampen down hot spots, demolish unsafe walls and recover other human remains.

Planned celebrations for the wedding of Princess Elizabeth that were due to be held on 20 November 1947 were cancelled and flags were instead flown at half mast throughout New Zealand, apart from a few official exemptions on Government Buildings. The ChristChurch Cathedral bell-ringers cancelled their wedding peals that were to be recorded and later broadcast on the radio.

A civic mass funeral was held on 23 November at Ruru Lawn Cemetery in Bromley, the largest funeral in Christchurch’s history. The Ballantyne Memorial Rose Garden was built at Ruru Lawn Cemetery. The pergola that is part of the memorial collapsed in the 2011 Christchurch earthquake but was later rebuilt.

Commission of Enquiry
A commission later determined that the fire response had been inadequate, and the building had not met fire regulations, though it had passed its last inspection four years earlier. The commission noted that the 30 minutes between the first call to the fire brigade and the point of flashover would have been enough time to evacuate everyone in the building without injury. Recommendations were made for changes in fire prevention and firefighting for all of New Zealand. Urgent changes were recommended for building regulations and fire safety requirements to prevent similar disasters.

Business recovery
After the fire, Ballantynes continued to trade from its undamaged building on Lichfield Street. The fire-damaged buildings were demolished and the main Ballantynes store was rebuilt on the corner of Colombo Street and Cashel Street.

Legacy
A dramatisation of the fire, Ablaze, was directed by Josh Frizzell and screened by TVNZ in 2019.

References

Fires in New Zealand
1940s in Christchurch
1947 in New Zealand
1947 fires in Oceania
November 1947 events in New Zealand
Department store fires
Building collapses caused by fire
1947 disasters in New Zealand